Montagu David Scott (15 March 1818 – 15 January 1900) was an English Conservative Party politician who sat in the House of Commons from 1874 to 1885.

Scott was the son of Sir David Scott, 2nd Baronet and his wife Caroline Grindall daughter of Benjamin Grindall. He was educated at University College, Oxford and was called to the bar at Middle Temple in 1840. He was a J.P. for Sussex and Middlesex, and a Deputy Lieutenant for Sussex.

He was elected at the 1874 general election as one of the two Members of Parliament (MPs) for East Sussex. He was re-elected in 1880, and held the seat until the constituency was divided at the 1885 general election.

Scott died at the age of  81.

Scott married Margaret Briggs, daughter of James Briggs of Oatlands Hertfordshire.

References

External links
 

1818 births
1900 deaths
Alumni of University College, Oxford
Members of the Middle Temple
Deputy Lieutenants of Sussex
Conservative Party (UK) MPs for English constituencies
UK MPs 1880–1885
UK MPs 1874–1880
Younger sons of baronets